Walter Van Beirendonck (born 4 February 1957 in Brecht, Belgium) is a Belgian fashion designer. He is the head of the Fashion Department at the Royal Academy of Fine Arts Antwerp.
 
He graduated in 1980 from the Royal Arts Academy in Antwerp. Together with Dirk Van Saene, Dries Van Noten, Ann Demeulemeester, Marina Yee (graduated in 1981) and Dirk Bikkembergs (graduated in 1982) they became known as the Antwerp Six  when the idea of Belgian fashion seemed like a contradiction in terms.
He was the fashion advisor for U2 and their pop Mart Tour and Erasure for their Cowboy-Tour (both 1997).

Since 1983, he issues his own collections. They are inspired by the visual arts, literature, nature and ethnic influences. His unusual color combinations and a strong graphic influence are characteristic for his collections. In 1997, he designed the costumes for the U2 "PopMart Tour". In 1999, he was awarded the honorary title of "Cultural Ambassador of Flanders". In 2001, he curated the 'Fashion 2001 Landed-Geland' project in Antwerp. Next to five large exhibitions, a new magazine was launched: N°A magazine, published by Artimo, now called A MAGAZINE curated by.

Collections

See also
 Antwerp Six
 List of fashion designers
 Ellen Ekkart

References

External links
Walter Van Beirendonck's official website

W6YZ, Italian Shoe brand designed by Walter Van Beirendonck for Falc

1957 births
Living people
Belgian fashion designers
Flemish designers
High fashion brands
Belgian LGBT artists
LGBT fashion designers
Royal Academy of Fine Arts (Antwerp) alumni